Hunt the thimble (also known as hide the thimble or hide the handkerchief in both the US and the UK) is a party game in which one person hides a thimble, or other small object, somewhere in the room, while all other players wait outside. (In some versions of the game, it must be hidden in plain sight.) When everyone comes back in, they race to locate the hidden object. The first to find it is the winner, and hides it for the next game.

Huckle buckle beanstalk (or Huckleberry bean stalk) is a similar childhood game which can be played with two or more players, one being the hider, or the person who is "it," and the other person or persons being seekers.

The game has also been known as hot buttered beans in the US  since at least 1830, and other names for it include hide the object and hide the key. William Wells Newell described a version called thimble in sight in his 1883 Games and Songs of American Children. The game is known in various European countries.

In some versions of the game, the hider tell the searchers what "temperature" they are based on proximity to the hidden object—the closer they get, the hotter they are; thus, the farther they are from the object, the colder they are.

Other variations involve only one person leaving the room and everybody else hiding the object. In Singing Hunt the Thimble, the hiders sing louder when the searcher is close to the object and softer when they are farther away.

Similar games exist in Germany (Topfschlagen, in which a blindfolded player must find a pot guided by calls of hot or cold ); in Poland (Ciepło-zimno) and in Russia (Kholodno-goryacho, both meaning Hot & Cold). In the Polish and Russian version a player is guided to find a hidden object by calls of cold, colder, warm, hot, boiling; blindfold is not used. The game exists also in Spanish speaking countries, where it is called La candelita (The Little Fire) or something similar.

Gameplay
The seekers must cover their eyes and ears or leave the designated game area while the hider hides a small, pre-selected object. When the hider says to come and find it, or after the seekers have counted to a specific number, usually sixty or one-hundred, the seekers come out and attempt to be the first to find the object. When a seeker has the object in hand, he can alert the other players of his success by yelling "Huckle Buckle Beanstalk!"

Brian Sutton-Smith and other writers put this in a category of "central person" games which give one individual child a central role. The set-up can be reversed with that role given to a single seeker, while all the other players try to keep an object hidden from the odd-one-out, either by sending him out of the room while hiding it, or by passing it round behind their backs. This is a common way of organising 'Hide the Key' or 'Hunt the Slipper'.

Variations
A variation of the game has the person who finds the object, continue by pretending to look for the object and then call out "Huckle Buckle Bean Stalk" to draw the other seekers attention away from the objects location.  As the other seekers find the object, they perform the same deception until all the seekers have found the object.  The winners take pride in how quickly they find the object and how much time passes between them and the next player who calls out "Huckle Buckle Bean Stalk".

History

Games played like this, sometimes with children forming a circle round the seeker, sometimes with one child blindfolded, pre-date Victorian parlour games. In 1838 Hunt the Slipper, played as a single-seeker circle game, was said by one writer to be "nearly out of fashion" in Southern England. In 1766 Oliver Goldsmith described it being played in The Vicar of Wakefield, calling it a "primaeval pastime". Several similar rhymes from different parts of England were recorded by 19th century folklorist Alice Gomme. They were sung or recited in games with one or more hiders: for example, "Little pigs come to supper/Hot boiled beans and ready butter." Other names were 'Hot Broad Beans' and 'Hot Beans and Butter.' In the US, the variations 'Hot Beans and Butter' and 'Hot Peas and Butter' require that the hidden item be a belt, which is placed in a secret location by a single hider. The other players are seekers. The first seeker to locate the belt can then attempt to whip the other players with it as they run for the safety of a designated home base.

A modern and more adult variation of Huckle Buckle Beanstalk is Geocaching.

Playing with Hot or Cold

Often, especially when there is only one seeker, the game is played using "hot or cold," where the hider informs the seeker how near he is to the object, telling him he is cold when he is far from the object (or freezing or if he is extremely far off), and hot when he is extremely close to the object. If the seeker is moving farther from the object, he is told he is getting colder, and if the seeker is moving closer to the object, he is told he is getting warmer.

Charles Dickens refers to this in Edwin Drood:
" . . . like the children in the game of hot boiled beans and very good butter, he was warm in his search when he saw the Tower, and cold when he didn't see it. "

In the season 4 episode of Full House titled "Ol' Brown Eyes," Michelle plays this game with Joey using Becky's engagement ring.

The game is also referenced in Planetfall where one of Floyd's behaviors mentions "Hucka-Bucka Beanstalk".

References

Bibliography
Alice Gomme, The Traditional Games of England, Scotland and Ireland (1894), republished by Thames & Hudson 1984
Rosalie V. Halsey, Forgotten Books of the American Nursery (1911)
Lydia Maria Child , The Girl's Own Book (1856)
B. Sutton-Smith; B. G. Rosenberg, Sixty Years of Historical Change in the Game Preferences of American Children in The Journal of American Folklore Vol. 74, No. 291 (Jan., 1961), pp. 17–46

External links
 
 
 
Alice Gomme

Party games
Children's games
Hide-and-seek variants